Shadow Ranch is a 1930 American pre-Code Western film directed by Louis King.

The Library of Congress Packard holds a print of the film.

Cast
Buck Jones as Sim Baldwin (as Charles 'Buck' Jones)
Marguerite De La Motte as Ruth Cameron
Kate Price as Maggie Murphy
Albert J. Smith as Dan Blake (as Al Smith)
Robert McKenzie as Lawyer
Frank Rice as Ranny Williams
Ben Corbett as Cowhand Ben
Ernie Adams as Henchman Joe
Slim Whitaker as Henchman Curley

References

External links

1930 films
1930 Western (genre) films
American black-and-white films
American Western (genre) films
Columbia Pictures films
1930s English-language films
Films directed by Louis King
1930s American films